The Yule Island tree frog (Litoria congenita) is a species of frog in the subfamily Pelodryadinae. It is found in New Guinea. Its natural habitats are moist savanna, intermittent freshwater marshes, rural gardens, and heavily degraded former forests.

References

Litoria
Amphibians described in 1878
Taxa named by Wilhelm Peters
Taxonomy articles created by Polbot